Wöhner GmbH & Co. KG is a German private limited company located in Rödental southern part of Germany. Founded in 1929 the company develops, manufactures and sells Bus systems solutions for Distribution board & electrical enclosures and has presence in 80 countries worldwide &  in a study found the company among top 180 fastest growing companies in Germany. and was started by Mr Alfred Wöhner in 1929.

Product range
The company manufacturers solutions for low voltage segment

Products
 Busbar systems
 Fuse holders
 Motor starter with reversing function
 Panel mounting components
 Fuse
 Value added services

References

Companies based in Bavaria
German brands
Electrical engineering companies of Germany